The Hackberry Creek Bridge, in Hodgeman County, Kansas near Jetmore, Kansas, was built in 1930.  It was listed on the National Register of Historic Places in 1985.

It has two concrete arch rings.

It is located 13 miles west and 11 miles north of Jetmore.

It was listed on the National Register as part of a study of masonry arch bridges in Kansas.

The bridge was in "excellent condition" in 1985.

References

External links

National Register of Historic Places in Hodgeman County, Kansas
Bridges completed in 1930
Bridges on the National Register of Historic Places in Kansas
Open-spandrel deck arch bridges in the United States